Parlette is a surname. Notable people with the surname include:

Alicia Parlette (1982–2010), American journalist
Linda Evans Parlette (born 1945), American politician